St Wenn is a civil parish and village in Cornwall, England, United Kingdom. The village is situated six miles (10 km) west of Bodmin and nine miles (14.5 km) east of Newquay. The parish population at the 2011 census was 369.

Other settlements in the parish include Rosenannon, Demelza, Tregonetha, and Tregurtha Barton, once the home of Michael Tregury, Archbishop of Dublin who died in 1471.  The last heir-male of the elder branch of this family died in the reign of Henry V. The Borlase family, ancestors of William Borlase, were residents of three farms in this parish.

Later William Hals, who wrote the Parochial History of Cornwall, lived here in the latter part of his life: Hals, who owned the rectorial tithes of St Wenn, died here.

There is a Cornish cross at Cross and Hand, a place in the valley next to Castle-an-Dinas and in the extreme south of the parish. This cross (locally known as Crossy Ann) marks the boundary of the parishes of St Wenn, St Columb Major and Roche.

Churches and schools

The parish church is dedicated to Saint Wenna. The church was in the 12th century in the possession of the Earl of Gloucester who gave it to Tewkesbury Abbey c. 1150. It was appropriated to the abbey in 1242 when the first vicar was instituted. The tower was built with three stages but now has only two as the top section was destroyed by lightning in 1663. There is a nave and two aisles of three bays. The font is 15th century work in the Norman style. and very similar to those of St Columb Minor and Mawgan-in-Pydar.

On the North Downs, called Carenza Wortha, (now called Rosenannon Downs) there used to be a chapel dedicated to St Mary Magdalen: it was destroyed in the English Civil War during the time of Charles I. There is a Methodist Chapel at Rosenannon and there used to be others.

St Wenn School is a primary school in St Wenn village.

History

In July 1940, during World War 2, a bomb was dropped near St Wenn. A small amount of damage was caused to property but nobody was injured.

The Chapman family which was famous over the last century for producing many Cornish wrestling champions (of Cornwall, England, South Africa and the United States) came from St Wenn. Examples include:
 Sidney Chapman
 Reuben Chapman
 Bernard Chapman
 William Chapman
 Charlie Chapman
 John Chapman
 M J Chapman
 Reuben Chapman (jnr)

References

External links

 Cornwall Record Office Online Catalogue for St Wenn

Civil parishes in Cornwall
Villages in Cornwall